Georgy Aleksandrovich Satarov (born August 22, 1947 in Moscow), is a Russian mathematician, politician, political scientist and a former aide to Russian President Boris Yeltsin (1994–1997). Since October 1997, he has headed the InDem Foundation and specializes in researching Russia's political corruption.

Biography 
In 1972, he graduated from the Moscow Lenin Pedagogical Institute, Mathematics Department, where he stayed on as a researcher until 1990. In 1993, he participated in devising a new Russian Constitution, which was adopted in December that year. From February 1994 until September 1997, he was an aide to President Boris Yeltsin as a member of the Presidential staff.

Starting in December 2004, Satarov, along with Lyudmila Alexeyeva and Garry Kasparov, co-chaired the All-Russian Civic Congress, which Alexeyeva and Satarov left due to disagreement with Kasparov in January 2008. From July 2006 until July 2007, Satarov was one of the key members of Russia's pro-democracy movement The Other Russia.

External links 
Satarov, Georgy Information on Lenta.ru in Russian

1947 births
Living people
1st class Active State Councillors of the Russian Federation
Mathematicians from Moscow
People's Freedom Party politicians
Russian activists against the 2022 Russian invasion of Ukraine
Recipients of the Order of Honour (Russia)
Russian people of Jewish descent
Russian political scientists
Politicians from Moscow